Glaucoclystis griseorufa is a moth in the family Geometridae. It is found in the north-eastern Himalayas and on Peninsular Malaysia and Borneo. The habitat consists of lowland forests.

Subspecies
Glaucoclystis griseorufa griseorufa (Himalaya)
Glaucoclystis griseorufa tranquillata (Prout, 1958) (Peninsular Malaysia, Borneo)

References

Moths described in 1898
Eupitheciini